Murattu Kaalai is a 1980 Indian Tamil-language action film directed by S. P. Muthuraman, and written by Panchu Arunachalam. The film stars Rajinikanth, Rati Agnihotri, Sumalatha and Jaishankar. It revolves around Kaalaiyan, an honourable villager who, despite being wealthy, chooses to live modestly while Sundaravelu, a less honourable man from the neighbouring village, tries to grab Kaalaiyan's land.

Murattu Kaalai was the first film for Rajinikanth with AVM Productions, and the company's re-entry into Tamil cinema after a long sabbatical. It was released on 20 December 1980 and became a major commercial success. The film was also instrumental in establishing Rajinikanth as both an action hero and superstar. It was remade again in Tamil under the same title and released in 2012.

Plot 
Kaalaiyan, a well-to-do and honourable landlord, lives modestly with his four brothers in a village. Sundaravelu is an equally rich but less honourable landlord in the neighbouring village. He lusts for Kaalaiyan's property and sends his assistant Saamipillai to him with an offer to buy his property. Saamipillai's family was burnt to death by Sundaravelu's father; Saamipillai had joined Sundaravelu's service as a mole, planning to destroy Sundaravelu at the appropriate time.

Kaalaiyan refuses to sell his property. Saamipillai, knowing well that Kaalaiyan is the best jallikattu player around, advises to Sundaravelu to organise a jallikattu game in the village festival and announce the reward as his sister Soundaryam's hand in marriage. Kaalaiyan wins, but refuses to marry Soundaryam as he is aware of Sundaravelu's devious plan, thus disappointing Soundaryam, who loved him, and also insulting Sundaravelu.

Sundaravelu falls in love with Kannamma, a girl of his village and proposes to her. When she refuses, he tries to molest her and she comes to Kaalaiyan seeking protection. Kaalaiyan allows her to stay at his house. She takes care of all the domestic work and impresses Kaalaiyan's brothers. When the villagers talk ill of Kannamma, Kaalaiyan's brothers decide to get Kannamma and Kaalaiyan married. To stop the wedding, Sundaravelu, at the instigation of Saamipillai, sends his henchman Sangili, who previously killed Kannamma's father, to fight Kaalaiyan. Kaalaiyan subdues Sangili but spares him.

Sundaravelu kills Sangili and frames Kaalaiyan. The police arrive at Kaalaiyan's marriage venue to arrest him. He escapes and hides in a forest. Soundaryam, coming to know about the misdeeds of her brother and his plans to destroy Kaalaiyan, argues with her brother and goes to the forest in search of Kaalaiyan. She finds him and reveals the truth. Sundaravelu, who had secretly followed Soundaryam to the forest, fights Kaalaiyan and takes his knife to kill him, but ends up killing Soundaryam, who came between the two.

Kaalaiyan is again framed for murder by Sundaravelu, the police intensify their search and a team of officers reach the forest. One of them is Sundaravelu's man and he attacks an officer. The corrupt officer assumes he is dead and leaves the place, but Kaalaiyan finds and saves him. Sundaravelu learns that the attacked officer survived and sends a group of thugs to attack Kaalaiyan when he is travelling in a train. Kaalaiyan fights the thugs and subdues them all; he forces one of them to inform Sundaravelu that Kaalaiyan and the policeman are dead.

During Sundaravelu's birthday party celebrations, Kaalaiyan and Kannamma come there disguised as dancers. When Sundaravelu gifts them money, Kaalaiyan reveals his true identity. A fight ensues, until a team of police officers arrives to arrest Sundaravelu for his crimes. When he demands witnesses and proof for his crimes, Saamipillai comes forward and agrees to give all the evidence, revealing his identity. Sundaravelu realises that he does not have any support and shoots himself dead to avoid arrest.

Cast 
 Rajinikanth as Kaalaiyan
 Rati Agnihotri as Kannamma
 Sumalatha as Soundaryam
 Suruli Rajan as Saamipillai
 Y. G. Mahendran as Kaalaiyan's first brother
 G. Srinivasan as Kannamma's father
 Shantharam as Sangili
 Rajappa as Kaalaiyan's second brother
 Master Ramu as Kaalaiyan's third brother
 S. A. Ashokan (Guest appearance)
 Thengai Srinivasan (Guest appearance)
 Jaishankar as Sundaravelu

Production

Development 
AVM Productions took a break from producing films after few of their films failed at box-office. Its founder A. V. Meiyappan wanted S. P. Muthuraman to direct a film for AVM featuring Rajinikanth and Kamal Haasan, and Muthuraman agreed. However, a month later, Meiyappan died and Muthuraman became upset at not fulfilling his wish. Soon after, Meiyappan's son M. Saravanan reminded Muthuraman about his father's wish and said he, along with his brothers, would produce the prospective film, reinvigorating Muthuraman. Rajinikanth, who had a long-time desire to appear in an AVM film, readily agreed when approached by Muthuraman. However, Haasan was reluctant as he and Rajinikanth did not intend to act together again; Haasan told Muthuraman to make a separate film for each actor. Saravanan decided that work on the Rajinikanth film begin first.

Panchu Arunachalam developed the script for the film, which was titled Murattu Kaalai. It marked the fourth collaboration between Muthuraman and Rajinikanth, and both men's first with AVM. The film also marked the comeback of AVM to Tamil films after a long sabbatical. It was co-produced by Saravanan's brothers M. Kumaran and M. Balasubramaniam, photographed by Babu and edited by R. Vittal.

Casting and filming 

Murattu Kaalai was the first film where Jaishankar, who was generally known for his heroic roles, portrayed a negative character. According to Muthuraman, the producers were initially hesitant to approach him, given his image, but Jaishankar agreed without any reservations. Rajinikanth wanted Jaishankar to get equal prominence in all the film's promotional material, and it happened that way. The makers chose to shoot the film in Pollachi as it had all that the script required: fields, forests, hills and rivers. The introductory jallikattu sequence and succeeding song "Pothuvaaga En Manasu Thangam" were shot at Paganeri, a village near Karaikudi. Since Muthuraman demanded a single horned bull with a particular colour also with that broken horn, the film's production manager had to scout every cattle markets for similar bulls but couldn't get such. After that they bought a bull and went to veterinary doctor who was forced to cut off the single horn from the bull and the crew waited for the wound to heal before shooting the scene. The fight sequence at the top of a train was choreographed by Judo. K. K. Rathnam, and took three days to film. According to Saravanan, the train fight scene was inspired by a Chinese film which was given by sons of Nalli Kuppuswami Chetti. Rajinikanth wore a wig designed by B. Natesan throughout the shoot to portray his character. The climax initially had the antagonist beaten and dragged by the police, but Rajinikanth could not bear to see Jaishankar in such a position; it was changed to have the character commit suicide to avoid arrest.

Soundtrack 
The music was composed by Ilaiyaraaja and the lyrics were written by Panchu Arunachalam. The song "Entha Poovilum" is based on Antonio Ruiz-Pipó's Cancion y Danza. "Pothuvaaga En Manasu Thangam" became immensely popular among fans of Rajinikanth, and featured prominently in the 1996 Tamil Nadu Legislative Assembly election.

Release and reception 
Murattu Kaalai was released on 20 December 1980. The review board of the magazine Ananda Vikatan gave the film a B rating (equal to 40 or 45 marks out of 100), calling it a mass commercial entertainer. The film was a major commercial success, running for over 100 days in theatres.

Legacy 
Murattu Kaalai popularised the trend of introduction songs which went on to become a trademark in Rajinikanth's films. The film also confirmed Rajinikanth's status as a superstar. As film historian G. Dhananjayan noted, "With [Murattu Kaalai], Rajinikanth went from being an acting hero to an action hero. He became a larger-than-life hero and superstar after this film." The train fight and jallikattu scenes remain landmark fight sequences in Tamil cinema. N. S. Ramnath wrote in Forbes India that though Tamil cinema became more experimental in the 1970s, Murattu Kaalai success "put a stop to experimentation in films, and pushed everyone on to the masala bandwagon". "Seeviduven" became one of the popular catchphrases from the film.

Murattu Kaalai was remade again in Tamil under the same title by K. Selva Bharathy. The remake featured a remix of "Pothuvaaga En Manasu Thangam". It was released in 2012, and failed to repeat the success of the original. R. S. Prakash of Bangalore Mirror compared Veeram (2014) to Murattu Kaalai because of how it depicted the male lead's relationship with his four younger brothers.

In popular culture 
The dialogue "Seeviduven" became so popular and Rajinikanth also went on to utter the same dialogue in some of his films like Mappillai. In Muthu (1995), the title character (Rajinikanth) is seen performing "Podhuvaga En Manasu" on stage. In Subramaniapuram (2008), Azhagar (Jai) and Paraman (Sasikumar) are seen watching Murattu Kaalai at a theatre. In Enthiran (2010), Pachaimuthu (Kalabhavan Mani) utters the dialogue "Seeviduven" while threatening Vaseegaran (Rajinikanth). The 2017 film Podhuvaga Emmanasu Thangam was named after the song from Murattu Kaalai.

References

Bibliography

External links 
 

1980 action films
1980 films
1980s Tamil-language films
AVM Productions films
Films directed by S. P. Muthuraman
Films scored by Ilaiyaraaja
Films with screenplays by Panchu Arunachalam
Indian action films
1980s masala films